Davino Verhulst (born 25 November 1987) is a Belgian professional footballer who plays as a goalkeeper for Belgian First Division A club Antwerp.

Career
At the age of fifteen, he joined the first team of KSK Beveren. Clubs like Manchester City, the Bolton Wanderers, and Udinese Calcio were interested in him but he choose to stay at the Freethiel. However, he has never been able to be a first choice keeper because of the presence of Boubacar Barry. He made his first team debut against Benfica in the UEFA Cup of 2004 after the red card of Copa but he could not avoid the 3–0 defeat and the following elimination.

In the 2005–2006 season he played 8 matches during an injury of Copa. He made some nice saves against teams like Club Brugge but was again relegated to second choice after Copa's recovery. In the 2006–2007 season he came in a twist with Copa, and in the winter transfer period, he was bought by leader KRC Genk as second choice behind Logan Bailly.

Verhulst was a regular member of the Belgium national under-19 football team.

Honours
Genk
Belgian Cup: 2008–09

Lokeren
Belgian Cup: 2013–14

References

 Profile 
 
 

1987 births
People from Beveren
Footballers from East Flanders
Living people
Belgian footballers
Belgium youth international footballers
K.R.C. Genk players
K.S.K. Beveren players
Willem II (football club) players
Sint-Truidense V.V. players
K.S.C. Lokeren Oost-Vlaanderen players
Apollon Smyrnis F.C. players
Royal Antwerp F.C. players
Eredivisie players
Belgian Pro League players
Super League Greece players
Belgian expatriate footballers
Expatriate footballers in the Netherlands
Expatriate footballers in Greece
Belgian expatriate sportspeople in the Netherlands
Belgian expatriate sportspeople in Greece
Association football goalkeepers